Acacia mackeyana is a shrub of the genus Acacia and the subgenus Plurinerves that is endemic to south western Australia.

Description
Like most species of Acacia it has phyllodes rather than true leaves. It blooms from June to August and produces yellow flowers.

Distribution
It is native to an area in the Mid West, Wheatbelt, Great Southern and Goldfields-Esperance regions of Western Australia where it is commonly situated on rocky rises, breakaways, and undulating sandplain growing in sandy, loamy or loam-clay soils often over and around laterite or granite. The bulk of the population is found between Coorow in the north west down to around Corrigin, Western Australia and Moorine Rock in the south east with outlying populations found near Mullewa, Ongerup, Ravensthorpe and the Frank Hann National Park.

See also
List of Acacia species

References

mackeyana
Acacias of Western Australia
Plants described in 1909
Taxa named by Alfred James Ewart